Scared Stiff is a 1996 pinball game designed by Dennis Nordman and released by Midway (under the Bally label), featuring horror show-hostess Elvira. It is the follow-up to 1989's Elvira and the Party Monsters, also designed by Nordman.

Description
The game features a B-movie horror theme. Players have to go through the Six Tales Of Terror to level up the Stiff-o-meter. These are: Eyes Of The Bony Beast, Terror From The Crate, the Stiff In The Coffin, the Monster's Lab, Night Of The Leapers, and the Return Of The Deadheads. The interactive backbox contains a player controlled spinning spider. It is used to collect unique features and start special modes. Scared Stiff uses the DCS Sound System.

Scared Stiff was exhibited at the 1996 AMOA show in Dallas, with Cassandra Peterson present in her Elvira identity to promote the game.

When Scared Stiff was introduced in 1996, it was designed to have moving rubber boogieman figures mounted over the slingshots. These were designed to move forward with the kicker each time the ball hit the slingshot. The game's ROM also allowed for the boogiemen to 'dance' to the music during the Boogie Man Boogie mode by kicking with the music. Very late in production, this feature was removed because the figures' arms were thought to eventually break off. An opening between the feet of the slingshot plastics is still present on all production machines, as well as an entry in the game's manual about the feature. Additionally, the code in the machine's ROM supports the feature. Because of this, many hobbyists have added the boogiemen figure modifications to their machines.

Digital version
Scared Stiff was available as a licensed table of The Pinball Arcade for several platforms until June 30th 2018.

References

External links
IPDB listing for Scared Stiff
Scared Stiff - robertwinter.com

1996 pinball machines
Bally pinball machines